Trevarren is a hamlet, north of Indian Queens in Cornwall, United Kingdom.

References

Hamlets in Cornwall